Anyu Township (Chinese: 安裕乡) is a township situated along a tributary stemming from the Lishui River in Anxiang County, Changde, Hunan, China. Anyu Township has a population of 17,806; 9,118 males and 8,688 females and  an age structure of: 2,011 aged under 14, 13,385 aged 15 to 64 and 2,410 aged over 65 years old.

Villages
Anyu Township has jurisdiction over the following villages:

 Qiangkou Village
 Shuangzhankou Village
 Xinhekou Village
 Wuyang Village
 Yifenju Village
 Tongqing Village
 Sanzui Village
 Wuyi Village
 Huaixi Village
 Youxin Village
 Hauifu Village

References 

Townships